The whiskey sour is a mixed drink containing whiskey (often bourbon), lemon juice, sugar, and optionally, a dash of egg white. It is a type of sour, a mixed drink with a base spirit, citrus juice, and a sweetener.

With egg white included, it is sometimes called a Boston sour; when the whiskey used is a Scotch, it is called a Scotch sour. With a few bar spoons of full-bodied red wine floated on top, it is often referred to as a New York sour. It is shaken and served either straight up or over ice.

The traditional garnish is half an orange slice and a maraschino cherry. The original version is made with Limón de Pica.

A variant of the whiskey sour is the Ward 8, which often is based on bourbon or rye whiskey, and includes both lemon and orange juices, and grenadine syrup as the sweetener. The egg white sometimes employed in other whiskey sours is not usually included.

History
The oldest historical mention of a whiskey sour was published in the Wisconsin newspaper, Waukesha Plain Dealer, in 1870.

In 1962, the Universidad del Cuyo published a story, citing the Peruvian newspaper El Comercio de Iquique, which indicated that Elliott Stubb created the "whisky sour" in Iquique in 1872. (El Comercio de Iquique was published by Modesto Molina between 1874 and 1879.)

References

Cocktails with whisky
Cocktails with Scotch whisky
Sour cocktails
Cocktails with eggs
Cocktails with lemon juice